Tarnish is a lost 1924 American silent drama film directed by George Fitzmaurice based upon the play of the same name by Gilbert Emery and starring May McAvoy, Ronald Colman, and Marie Prevost. It was one of the last films produced by Goldwyn before the company's merger with Metro and Mayer.

Cast
 May McAvoy as Letitia Tevis  
 Ronald Colman as Emmet Carr  
 Marie Prevost as Nettie Dark  
 Albert Gran as Adolph Tevis  
 Priscilla Bonner as Aggie  
 Harry Myers as The Barber  
 Kay Deslys as Mrs. Stutts  
 Lydia Yeamans Titus as Mrs. Healy  
 William Boyd as Bill  
 Snitz Edwards as Mr. Stutts
 Mrs. Russ Whytal

References

Bibliography
 Monaco, James. The Encyclopedia of Film. Perigee Books, 1991.

External links

Stills as silenthollywood.com

1924 films
1924 drama films
Silent American drama films
Films directed by George Fitzmaurice
American black-and-white films
American silent feature films
Lost American films
1924 lost films
Lost drama films
1920s English-language films
1920s American films